Prostitution in Egypt is illegal. The Egyptian National Police officially combats prostitution but, like almost all other countries, prostitution exists in Egypt. UNAIDS estimate there to be 23,000 prostitutes in the country, including Egyptians, West African and Eastern Europeans.

History

Ancient Egypt
Little is known about the practice of prostitution in ancient Egypt. The Turin Erotic Papyrus depicts women, possibly prostitutes, engaged in sexual acts with men. Permanent body adornment such as tattoos, appearing as dotted diamond shapes on the thighs of figurines and mummies, or as images of the god Bes, are seen on depictions of professional entertainers and prostitutes. Strabo, writing about Roman Egypt, recounts that daughters of noble families could be given into the service of the god Amun or Zeus; she was said to become a prostitute, engaging in sex with whomever she likes, until the onset of menstruation.

Roman occupation

As in the rest of the Roman Empire, prostitution was regulated. Prostitutes had to be registered and taxes were collected from them.

Middle Ages
Prostitution was generally tolerated and taxed during this period, the rulers taking the view that prohibition would not stop prostitution and that tax revenue would be lost.

There were periods when prostitution was prohibited following pressure on the rulers from Muslim clerics.

Ottoman rule
Under Ottoman rule, the regulation and taxation of prostitutes continued. During the 17th century two guilds for prostitutes were set up.

French occupation
Prostitution flourished following the French invasion of Egypt in 1798. The French organised additional prostitutes brought over from Europe. STIs spread rapidly through the brothels and this prompted the French authorities to introduce a law forbidding French troops from entering a brothel or having prostitutes in their rooms. Offenders received a death penalty.

Rule of Muhammad Ali
In 1834 Muhammad Ali Pasha outlawed prostitution and female public dancing in Cairo. The prostitutes and dancers were sent to Upper Egypt, especially Kena, Esna and Aswan. In 1837 he extended this to all of Egypt.

Article 240 of the Mixed Penal Code of 1867 states: A pimp who incites young men or women below the age of 21 to evil practices leading to rape is to be punished by a period of imprisonment not less than one month and not more than one year. Article 241 increases the penalty if the offence is committed by the father, mother or guardian of a minor.

Following the abolition of slavery in 1877, many recently freed female slaves turned to prostitution to survive.

British occupation

After the British occupation of 1882, the authorities were concerned about disease spreading amongst the troops. They made legal provisions to control prostitution and introduced a system of healthcare. In July 1885 Egypt's Ministry of the Interior introduced regulations for the health inspection of prostitutes. Further regulations were introduced in 1896 to control brothels.

Australian soldiers stationed in Egypt in World War I including the famous half Chinese Australian sniper Billy Sing were major customers of Egyptian prostitutes in the local red light districts and brothels. High prices by the prostitutes led to the Wasser red light area becoming the scene of a major riot by New Zealand and Australian soldiers on Good Friday in 1915. The Australian military arranged for medical treatment for venereal diseases among its soldiers in Port Said and Cairo.

In 1932 a Cabinet decree abolished licences for prostitution and established the "Public Morals Police".

A new penal code was introduced in 1937 and included a section to punish men who lived off the earnings of prostitutes.

In 1949 Military Order no. 76 was issued abolishing brothels.

Law No. 68, introduced in 1951, penalizing:
 Acts of prostitution if carried out habitually
 Acts of prostitution whether carried out by males or females. (The term prostitution was used in regard to females; for males the term used was licentiousness.)
 Acts inciting others to engage in prostitution
 International trading of prostitutes (white slavery) 
 The provision of housing or other premises where prostitutes can carry on their trade
 The advertisement of prostitution whether in an open or disguised way.

The prostitution system 
The prostitution system in Egypt often depends on pimping, although women also work alone. Pimps in Egypt organize the work of a group of prostitutes and receive a percentage of their profits. This is called the network in Egypt. This system is mainly used in Cairo and Alexandria and other big cities.

Nikah mut‘ah
Nikah mut‘ah is a temporary marriage allowed under Shia Islam Law. The 'marriage' may last for a term of one hour to one year. It is sometimes used to circumvent the prostitution laws.

Summer marriages
Wealthy men from the Gulf states often holiday in Egypt in the summer months. Whilst there they may take a young, temporary bride (often under-age) in a so-called summer marriage. The marriages are arranged through a marriage broker and the girl's parents receive gifts and money as a 'dowry'. The marriage ends when the men return to their own country.

Prostitution in the economy 
As prostitution is illegal in Egypt, no taxes are paid. The law exposes people who practice adultery to a jail sentence up to six months. For prostitution, the sentence is up to 3 years.

Sex trafficking

Egypt is a source, transit, and destination country for women and children subjected to sex trafficking. Egyptian children are vulnerable to sex trafficking. Individuals from the Persian Gulf, including Saudi Arabia, United Arab Emirates, and Kuwait purchase Egyptian women and girls for "temporary" or "summer" marriages for the purpose of commercial sex, including cases of sex trafficking; these arrangements are often facilitated by the victims' parents and marriage brokers, who profit from the transaction. Child sex tourism occurs primarily in Cairo, Alexandria, and Luxor.

Women and girls, including refugees and migrants, from Asia, Sub-Saharan Africa, and the Middle East endure sex trafficking in Egypt. Syrian refugees who have settled in Egypt remain increasingly vulnerable to exploitation, including sex trafficking, and transactional marriages of girls—which can lead to sexual exploitation, including sex trafficking,

The United States Department of State Office to Monitor and Combat Trafficking in Persons ranks Egypt as a 'Tier 2' country.

Notes

References
"Sex Tourism in Cairo" by Karim el-Gawhary, Middle East Report, Vol. 25, no. 5, September–October 1995; hosted by Hartford Web Publishing
"In Egypt, 'Prostitute' Is a Slippery Term" by L.L. Wynn, American Sexuality magazine, 26 June 2008

External links
 Prostitution status by country